Xu Mingfu (born 17 July 1997) is an alpine skier who competes for China. He competed for China at the 2022 Winter Olympics in the downhill, Super-G, giant slalom, slalom, and combined. He was the first Chinese athlete to finish a downhill alpine skiing competition.

References

Living people
Olympic alpine skiers of China
Chinese male alpine skiers
1997 births
Alpine skiers at the 2022 Winter Olympics
21st-century Chinese people
Alpine skiers at the 2017 Asian Winter Games